Sport Club Internacional, commonly known as Internacional or Gurias Coloradas, is a Brazilian women's Association football club, based in the city of Porto Alegre, Rio Grande do Sul, Brazil. They won the  eleven times.

History
Founded in 1983 as a women's section of Sport Club Internacional, winning the first two editions of the  before the tournament was stopped.

Internacional was again third in the league in the 1996, 1998 and 2001 editions, while also winning three Gaúcho titles in a row in 1997, 1998 and 1999. After finishing second in the Gaúcho during the 2000 and 2001 editions, the club won two consecutive titles in 2002 and 2003, before ceasing activities in 2011.

After a period of inactivities, Internacional re-opened their women's football section in 2017, and immediately won another Gaúcho title. They lost the 2018 title to rivals Grêmio, but won three titles in a row in 2019, 2020 and 2021.

Players

Current squad

Former players

Honours
 :
 Winners (11): 1983, 1984, 1997, 1998, 1999, 2002, 2003, 2017, 2019, 2020, 2021

References

External links
 

Sport Club Internacional
Women's football clubs in Brazil
Association football clubs established in 1983
1983 establishments in Brazil